The 2007 Big South Conference men's basketball tournament was the postseason tournament for the Big South Conference from February 27 to March 3, 2007. The tournament was held at campus sites, with the higher seeds serving as host. The Winthrop Eagles won the tournament, their third straight of what would be four consecutive titles.

Format
The top eight eligible teams can qualify for the tournament. The seeds are judged by conference winning percentage. The winner receives an automatic bid to the NCAA Tournament.

Bracket

First round held at campus sites of higher seeds
Semifinals and final held at Winthrop Coliseum, Rock Hill, SC

References

Tournament
Big South Conference men's basketball tournament
Big South Conference men's basketball tournament
Big South Conference men's basketball tournament
Big South Conference men's basketball tournament